Leslie Jones (25 March 1905 – 5 December 1993) was an Australian rules footballer who played with Hawthorn in the Victorian Football League (VFL).

Jones, who was from Foster, made five appearances for Hawthorn in the 1929 VFL season.

References

1905 births
1993 deaths
Australian rules footballers from Victoria (Australia)
Hawthorn Football Club players
People from Foster, Victoria